Alexis Floyd (born December 22, 1993) is an American actress best known for her portrayal of Neff in the Netflix series Inventing Anna.

Early years and education
Alexis Floyd was born and raised in Cleveland, Ohio, in a musical family.  Her mother, a classically trained flutist, is manager of Cleveland Youth Orchestra and her father was a classically trained tenor before becoming a lawyer.  She took up violin at age three. She was a competitive figure skater, did violin recitals at the Youth Orchestra, studied at the Cleveland School of Ballet and did musical theater at several venues, including Cleveland Playhouse and 
Cleveland Public Theater.  Her education was entirely in private schools. For high school she attended Hawken School, and went on to Carnegie Mellon to study musical theater. In 2012 she studied at The Rhodopi International Theater Collective in Bulgaria, where she studied Suzuki method, mime, and aerial art. After college graduation she moved to Los Angeles and then to New York City where she now lives. At the time of her audition for the role of Neff, Floyd was working as a concierge at a New York high-end yoga studio.

Career
Her career prior to her role as Neff was primarily off-Broadway and a recurring role as Tia Clayton in Freeform's Bold Type. Her  other activities included choreography and dancing on short films and music videos. 

Her career took a leap forward when she landed the role of Neff in Inventing Anna. The series is the true life story of Anna Sorokin, a Russian born woman who claimed to be Anna Delvey, a German heiress who faked her way into New York high society .  She did much preparation before auditioning. "A bit of a social media recluse," Floyd was unaware of the Sorokin/Delvey story; to learn about it she read as much as she could.  Floyd learned the Prince George's County accent of Neff, with some New York thrown in. When Floyd got the role she met the "real Neff," Neffatari (Neff) Davis. They met several times, so that Floyd would have some understanding of dynamics of the friendship between Neff and Anna.   Floyd's role was as a concierge at a boutique hotel Anna Delvey was staying in. The concierge became crucial to Anna, and her only friend.  Neff was the key to getting Anna V–VIP access to exclusive parties, shopping services and restaurants. Floyd's portrayal of Neff has been critically well received. Her performance has been described as a "scene stealer and truly magnetic." Floyd felt she could easily relate to Neff Davis; they live down the street from each other in Brooklyn, and:We both worked front-desk jobs. We’re both struggling to keep the balls in the air of tending the flame of your art but also keeping food on the table. There were a lot of stars aligning between the two of us. On July 19, 2022, it was announced that Floyd will be a series regular during the 19th season of the hit ABC series, Grey’s Anatomy.

Personal
Floyd has a younger brother, Aric Floyd, who is an actor.

References

External links
 

Actresses from Cleveland
American television actresses
1993 births
Living people
African-American actresses
African-American choreographers
American choreographers
African-American female dancers
Hawken School alumni
Carnegie Mellon University alumni
American musical theatre actresses
21st-century American actresses
20th-century African-American people
21st-century African-American people
21st-century American dancers
American women choreographers